Stetsonia is a genus of Foraminifera with five species.

References 

Pseudoparrellidae
Rotaliida genera